Philippe Hersant (born 21 June 1948 in Rome) is a French composer. He studied at the Conservatoire de Paris.

Selected works 
 Hersant's works are largely published by Éditions Durand.
Stage
 Le Château des Carpathes, Opera in a prologue and 2 scenes (1989–1991); libretto by Jorge Silva Melo after the novel by Jules Verne
 Wuthering Heights, Ballet in 2 acts (2000–2001); based on the novel by Emily Brontë
 Le Moine noir, Opera in 8 scenes (2003–2005); libretto by Yves Hersant after the short story The Black Monk by Anton Chekhov
 Les Éclairs, Opera ("drame joyeux") in 4 acts (2021); libretto by Jean Echenoz after his novel Des éclairs

Orchestral
 Aztlan (1983)
 Stances (1978, revised 1992)
Le Cantique des 3 enfants dans la fournaise (1995), poem by Antoine Godeau, in front of La Messe à 4 Choeurs H.4 by Marc-Antoine Charpentier with same chorus and orchestra. (recorded in 2019)
5 Pièces (1997)
 Patmos for string orchestra (2007)

Concertante
 Concerto No. 1 for cello and orchestra (1989)
 Concerto No. 2 for cello and orchestra (1996–1997)
 Streams for piano and orchestra (2000)
 Concerto for violin and orchestra (2003)
 Musical humors, Concerto for viola and string orchestra (2003)
 Le Tombeau de Virgile for harp and orchestra (2006)
 Concerto for clarinet and orchestra (2011)

Chamber music
 String Quartet No. 1 (1985)
 Pavane for viola solo (1987)
 String Quartet No. 2 (1988)
 Élégie for string quartet (1990)
 Duo Séphardim for viola and bassoon (1993)
 11 Caprices for 2 violins (or violas) (1994)
 8 Duos for viola and bassoon (1995)
 Niggun for solo bassoon (1995)
 In nomine for 7 cellos (2001)
 3 Nocturnes for flute, viola and harp (2001)
 Sonata for cello solo (2003)
 Choral for cello and harp (2004)
 Tenebrae for viola and piano (2005)
 6 Bagatelles for clarinet, viola and piano (2007)

Film scores

References

External links
Philippe Hersant website https://philippehersant.fr

1948 births
Living people
Conservatoire de Paris alumni
French male classical composers
French film score composers
French male film score composers
French opera composers
Male opera composers